In the following list of foreign observers of Russia dates are normally date of first publication, or other appropriate date where this is not possible

922: Ahmed ibn Fadlan travelled from Bagdad to near Kazan, saw Vikings
c. 950: Ahmad ibn Rustah went to Novgorod
c. 1241: Snorri Sturluson described Rus chieftains as typical Vikings
c. 1300: Marco Polo mentioned Russia as a distant country in the far north
1476: Ambrogio Contarini Venetian ambassador to Persia, passed through Moscow. Early (earliest?) printed source
1486: Iurii Trakhaniot Muscovite ambassador to Milan, interviewed by Milanese officials, their report possibly not published
1487: Giosafat Barbaro Venetian to Sea of Azov, published 1543
1515 Jacob Piso: Polish anti-Russian propaganda, never in Russia
1517: Maciej Miechowita "first accurate geography of Eastern Europe"
1519 Christian Bomhover: Teutonic Knight, first book solely on Russia, very hostile, never visited Russia, little cited by later authors.
1525–1543: Albert Compense, Paolo Giovo, Johan Fabri: Favorable accounts in interest of church union. Never in Russia.
c. 1527: Sigismund von Herberstein, Habsburg ambassador to Moscow. Saw government as despotic. Much copied by later writers.
1553: Richard Chancellor reached Muscovy via the White Sea, wrote Booke of the Great and Mighty Emperor of Russia
1561–1583: During the Livonian War a number of anti-Russian pamphlets published in the German lands.
1578: Heinrich von Staden German soldier, in oprichnina
1586: Antonio Possevino Papal diplomat
1589: Richard Hakluyt published voyages of the Muscovy Company
1589: Anthony Jenkinson, with Muscovy Company, to Moscow, Astrakhan, Bukhara and Persia, published in Hakluyt
1591: Giles Fletcher, the Elder English ambassador to Muscovy, wrote Of the Russe Common Wealth
1607: Jacques Margeret French mercenary, 'first printed French book on Russia'
1610: Isaac Massa Dutch merchant and envoy, via White Sea
1615: Peter Petreius Swedish diplomat, wrote History of the Grand Duchy of Moscow
1617: Conrad Bussow German involved in Time of Troubles
1621: Jerome Horsey with Muscovy Company
1647: Adam Olearius Holstein ambassador to Persia via Muscovy and the Volga
1653: Paul of Aleppo favorable view of an Orthodox theocracy. In Arabic, English translation 1829
1663: Juraj Križanić Croat and proto pan-slav. Advocated liberalizing reforms similar to the later enlightened despotism
1671: Samuel Collins (physician) physician to the Czar
c. 1678: Nicolae Milescu Moldavian in Siberia and China
c. 1680: Patrick Gordon: Scots soldier, left diary
1682: John Milton A Brief History of Muscovy compiled from other sources
1687: Foy de la Neuville possibly travelled in Russia
1701: Dembei Japanese castaway taken to St Petersburg
1712: Tulishen Manchu ambassador to Russia and the Kalmycks
1721: Friedrich Christian Weber German diplomat
c. 1723: Lorenz Lange Swede in Siberia and China
1729–1732: Two Chinese embassies to Russia
c. 1733: Johan Gustaf Renat Swede captured by Russians and then Dzungars. Mapped Siberia and Dzungaria
1746? Georg Wilhelm Steller journals of the Bering expedition
1751: Johann Georg Gmelin, with Bering, botany of Siberia
1757: Gerhard Friedrich Müller, with Bering, examined Siberian archives
1771: Peter Simon Pallas German natural historian
1784: William Richardson (classicist) Scots traveler 
c. 1829: Alexander von Humboldt German naturalist
1839: Marquis de Custine very hostile
1847: August von Haxthausen publicized the peasant commune
1870: George Kennan (explorer) in eastern Siberia
1876: Edward Delmar Morgan British traveler and translator
1877: Donald Mackenzie Wallace British journalist
1894: Constance Garnett translated Russian novels
1909: Jeremiah Curtin visited Buryats
1913–1919: Arthur Ransome English author, journalist and translator; witnessed revolution 
1919: John Reed (journalist) witnessed revolution

See also
For the Soviet period see :Category:Writers about the Soviet Union

References
Marshall T. Poe, "A People Born to Slavery: Russia in Early Modern European Ethnography, 1476–1748", 2000
Anthony Cross, "In the Lands of the Romanovs: An annotated bibliography of first-hand English-language accounts of the Russian Empire (1613–1917), 2014

Writers about Russia
Foreign observers of Russia
Foreign observers of Russia